Franklin Boone Emmons (September 17, 1918 – November 5, 2005) was an American football fullback who played for the Philadelphia Eagles of the National Football League (NFL) for one season in 1940. He played college football at Oregon before being selected by the Eagles in the fifth round of the 1940 NFL Draft.

After playing for the Eagles as a rookie in 1940, the team moved to Pittsburgh in a series of transactions known as the Pennsylvania Polka and became the Pittsburgh Steelers. He did not play for the Steelers in 1941, however, and retired shortly after. He served in World War II for the United States Army Air Forces.

References

1918 births
2005 deaths
American football fullbacks
Oregon Ducks football players
Philadelphia Eagles players
Players of American football from Portland, Oregon
United States Army Air Forces personnel of World War II